Rowland L. Davis (July 11, 1871 - February 2, 1954) was a New York State Supreme Court Justice.

Early life 
Davis, of Cortland, New York, was born in Dryden, Tompkins County, New York, on July 11, 1871. He was the son of Lucius Davis (1835-1912) and Harriet (Francis) Davis (1839-1915.) Davis attended the district school near McLean and graduated from the Cortland Normal School (today SUNY Cortland). While at the normal school he became a member of the Young Men's Debating Club (later to be known as the Delphic Fraternity.) Davis then graduated from Cornell Law School in 1897. He was admitted to the bar on July 6, 1897.

Legal career 
Davis practiced law from 1897 to 1915. From 1897 to 1902, Davis practiced law in Cortland with Bronson & Davis and from 1902 until 1915 with Davis & Lusk. In March 1899, he was elected a police justice of the Village of Cortland, and when the village first became a city, he was elected first city judge in 1903.

Justice Davis was elected to the New York Supreme Court in 1915 and was designated an associate justice of the Appellate Division, Fourth Department in 1921. Davis was a justice of the Appellate Division of the New York Supreme Court, 1921-39 (4th Department 1921-26, 3rd Department 1926-31, 2nd Department 1931-39.) He retired from the bench in March, 1939, moving on to two years of trial work in the 6th District before final retirement on March 31, 1941.  He was a Republican.

Personal life 
Davis was married to Iva A. Yager Davis (1883 - 1963).
According to his Sons of the American Revolution Application dated Sept 26, 1932 National #52752 he was a descendant of John Lane Davis and Dolor Davis.  On that same application he lists 2 children: Rowland Jr born Aug 3, 1907 and Harriet born May 2, 1910.

Death 
Justice Rowland L. Davis died in Cortland, N.Y. on February 2, 1954. He was 82 years old.

He was buried at the Cortland Rural Cemetery.

References 

The Cortland Normal News, February 1893, Volume 15, No. 6, page 19.
Political Graveyard.com
The Delphic Fraternity, Inc.
Supreme Court of the State of New York
The Historical Society of the Courts of the State of New York
THE HISTORY AND JUSTICES OF THE NYS APPELLATE DIVISION, THIRD DEPARTMENT

1871 births
1954 deaths
New York Supreme Court Justices
Cornell Law School alumni
New York (state) Republicans